Cyril Watkin (21 July 1926 – 3 July 2007) was an English footballer who played in the Football League for Bristol City and Stoke City.

Career
Watkin was born in Stoke-on-Trent and joined local side Stoke City in 1940 after previously working for Sneyd Colliery. During World War II he briefly guested for Port Vale. He broke into the Stoke first team during the 1948–49 season and missed only five matches in 1949–50. However Watkin was unable to maintain his place in the side at the Victoria Ground and once manager Bob McGrory had left and Frank Taylor had been appointed, Watkin was deemed surplus to requirements and he was sold to Third Division South side Bristol City. Despite having been a First Division regular only a few years previously, he only managed three appearances for Pat Beasley's "Robins" before he decided to retire.

Career statistics
Source:

References

Footballers from Stoke-on-Trent
English footballers
Association football fullbacks
Stoke City F.C. players
Bristol City F.C. players
Port Vale F.C. wartime guest players
English Football League players
1926 births
2007 deaths